Benjamin Lee Reed (born May 1, 1965) is an American actor and producer.

Early life
Reed was born in Bixby, Oklahoma on May 1, 1965. He played as a quarterback at West Virginia University.

Career
Reed began his acting career when he appeared in the 1990 sitcom Babes.

His television credits include The Young and the Restless, CSI: Crime Scene Investigation, Murder, She Wrote, Lois & Clark: The New Adventures of Superman, House, Seinfeld and NCIS.

He played Wayne Kyle, the father of Bradley Cooper's character in the critically acclaimed 2014 Clint Eastwood film American Sniper.

Personal life
He has a daughter and a son with Tanya Tucker.

Filmography

Film

Television

References

External links

1965 births
American male film actors
American male television actors
20th-century American male actors
21st-century American male actors
Male actors from Oklahoma
People from Bixby, Oklahoma
Living people